Skipness Castle stands on the east side of the Kintyre peninsula in Scotland, near the village of Skipness. Together with the nearby Kilbrannan Chapel it is a scheduled ancient monument.

History
The main structure of the castle was built in the early 13th century by the Clan MacSween, with later fortifications and other additions made to the castle through the 13th, 14th and 16th centuries.

The castle was garrisoned with royal troops in 1494, during King James IV of Scotland's suppression of the Isles. James IV appointed Duncan Forestar as keeper of the castle. Archibald Campbell, 2nd Earl of Argyll, granted Skipness to his younger son, Archibald Campbell, in 1511.

During the Wars of the Three Kingdoms in 1646, the castle was besieged by forces under the command of Alasdair Mac Colla. During the siege, Alasdair's brother, Gilleasbuig Mac Colla, was killed in August 1646. The castle was abandoned in the 17th century.

Castle ghost
The Green Lady of Skipness Castle is said to haunt the location.

References

External links

Castles in Argyll and Bute
Scheduled Ancient Monuments in Argyll and Bute
Reportedly haunted locations in Scotland
Historic Scotland properties in Argyll and Bute